Marm may refer to: 

 schoolmarm, a female teacher
 a female fuddy-duddy
 Fredericka Mandelbaum (1818–1894), a New York entrepreneur and criminal fence to many of the street gangs and criminals of the city's underworld, often called "Marm"
 marm, a powerful symbiotic monster in the James Stokoe comic book series "Orc Stain"